Fork Branch is a  long 3rd order tributary to the St. Jones River in Kent County, Delaware.

Variant names
According to the Geographic Names Information System, it has also been known historically as:  
Cranbrook River
Downs Branch
Fisher Branch
Warge Kijhlen
Wulfs Creek

Course
Fork Branch rises on the Pinks Branch and Jordan Branch divide about 0.1 miles west of Seeneytown, Delaware.

Watershed
Fork Branch drains  of area, receives about 44.8 in/year of precipitation, has a topographic wetness index of 654.31 and is about 10.5% forested.

See also
List of rivers of Delaware

Maps

References 

Dover, Delaware
Rivers of Delaware
Rivers of Kent County, Delaware
Tributaries of Delaware Bay